The Evangelical Church is a place of worship for the Evangelical Lutheran Church in Cluj-Napoca, Romania. It was built between 1816 and 1829, following plans drawn by the architect Georg Winkler. The church is 33.8 m in length and 18 m in width, with a 43 m tower, marked with the inscription PIETATI. The sanctuary was decorated by Johann Gentiluomo, and, in 1913, the church received a pipe organ, built in Ludwigsburg.

Current Pastors
Adorjani Dezső Zoltán (bishop), Fehér Attila (counselor), Fehér Olivér (trainee), Kerékgyártó Imola Orsoly (trainee).

References

Lukacs Jozsef, Povestea „oraşului-comoară”, Editura Biblioteca Apostrof, Cluj-Napoca, 2005

External links
 Official website of the Evangelical Lutheran Church in Romania
  Church website
 Old pictures of the church

Churches in Cluj-Napoca
Lutheran churches in Romania
Churches completed in 1829
19th-century Lutheran churches
Historic monuments in Cluj County